Chevry is a commune in the Ain department, in the region of Auvergne-Rhône-Alpes, eastern France. Chevry's inhabitants are called Chevrysiens.

Chevry is located between Gex and Saint-Genis-Pouilly, on the departmental highway RD984, which is the primary access to the town. It is twenty minutes from the Swiss border near Geneva. The commune also includes the villages of Veraz (to the east) and Naz-Dessous (to the north).

The town has several rivers: the Great Journans, Petit Journans, the Allondon and Janvoin.

Population

See also
Communes of the Ain department

References

Communes of Ain